K.Mettupalayamvadivel  is a village located in, Gobichettipalayam Taluk of Erode district of India's Tamilnadu state, situated in the way of Erode- Sathyamangalam Main road and its 8 kilometers from Gobichettipalayam.  

The village is situated in the canal of Kalichettiplayam. So this is called as Kalichettipalayam Mettupplayam(K.Mettuppalayam).

K.Mettupalayam  is fully surrounded by fertile land. The backbone of this village is mainly agriculture and handloom weaving.

People
The people are mostly farmers and handloom weavers.

Education
Basic education is given by Panchayat Union High School.

School
Panchayat Union High School

College
Shree Venkateswara Hitech Engineering College & Shree Venkateswara Hitech Polytechnic College.

Library
The library is established in the village for enhancing the knowledge and current affairs for the people and young students.

Temple

Raja Ganapathy Temple, Arulmigu Kamatchi Amman Temple, Mari Amman Temple, Komalikarai Sellandi Amman Temple, Komalikarai Vinayakar Temple and Komalikarai Perumal Temple, Sai Baba Temple, Swamy Ayyappan Temole

Market
The weekly Market with 100 shops nearly on every Thursday. In this market-fresh Fruits, Vegetables are brought directly from agricultural land and sold to villagers.

Business
Vegetables&
Hand Loom Weaving
Textiles

Culture
Saree,
Half Saree,
Churidhar for Women and Shirt and Dhoti for Men......

Food
Rice, Idly, Dosa

Agriculture
The following crops are produced in this village
1. Rice
2. Sugarcane
3. Banana
4. Turmeric
5. Vegetables
6. Sericulture

Villages in Erode district